Joe Williams (born Joseph Goreed; December 12, 1918 – March 29, 1999) was an American jazz singer. He sang with big bands such as the Count Basie Orchestra and the Lionel Hampton Orchestra and with his combos. He sang in two films with the Basie orchestra and sometimes worked as an actor.

Life
Williams was born in Cordele, Georgia, the son of Willie Goreed and Anne Beatrice née Gilbert.  When he was about three, his mother and grandmother took him to Chicago. He grew up on the South Side of Chicago, where he attended Austin Otis Sexton Elementary School and Englewood High School. In the 1930s, as a teenager, he was a member of a gospel group, the Jubilee Boys, and performed in Chicago churches.

Work 

He began singing professionally as a soloist in 1937. He sometimes sang with big bands: from 1937 he performed with Jimmie Noone's Apex Club Orchestra, and also toured with Les Hite in the Midwest. In 1941 he toured with Coleman Hawkins to Memphis, Tennessee. In 1943 he performed in Boston with the Lionel Hampton Orchestra. He sang with Red Saunders at the Club DeLisa in Chicago in 1945, and in 1946 was in New York with Andy Kirk.

In the late 1940s Williams was ill and performed little. By October 1950 he was again at the Club DeLisa with Red Saunders, where Count Basie heard him.

From 1954 to 1961 he was the singer for the Count Basie Orchestra. "Every Day I Have the Blues", recorded in 1955, and "Alright, Okay, You Win" were among many successful recordings from this period.

After leaving the Basie band, Williams had a successful career as a soloist at festivals, in clubs and on television. He and Basie remained on good terms and he regularly appeared with the Basie orchestra. He toured and made recordings with many other musicians, including Harry "Sweets" Edison in 1961–62, Junior Mance between 1962 and 1964, George Shearing in 1971, and Cannonball Adderley between 1973 and 1975. He went on a long tour from Egypt to India with Clark Terry in 1977, and toured Europe and the United States with Thad Jones and the Basie Orchestra in 1985. He also worked with his own combos, which between 1970 and 1990 usually included the pianist Norman Simmons, and often had Henry Johnson on guitar.

Williams sang with the Basie orchestra in two films, Jamboree in 1957 and Cinderfella in 1960. He sometimes worked as an actor, and he had a supporting role in the movie The Moonshine War released in 1970 from a story by Elmore Leonard starring Patrick McGoohan, Richard Widmark, Alan Alda and Will Geer. In 1985 he played the role of "Grandpa Al" Hanks on The Cosby Show over 4 episodes as Cosby's father-in-law. Williams appeared several times on Sesame Street in the 1980s and early 1990s.

In 1982 Joe played the part of a famous jazz musician, Sonny Goodman, in an episode ("Jazz") of the newspaper series, Lou Grant.

In later life Williams often worked in hotels and clubs in Las Vegas, but also sang at festivals and worked on cruise ships. He toured again with the Basie Orchestra, this time under the direction of Frank Foster, who had succeeded Thad Jones as leader of the band. Williams sang with the former Ellington Orchestra drummer Louie Bellson in Duke Ellington's jazz suite Black, Brown and Beige; in about 1993 or 1994 he again toured with George Shearing.

Williams worked regularly until his death in Las Vegas on March 29, 1999, at the age of 80. He had been hospitalized the week before for a respiratory ailment, though the death was of natural causes.

Awards and honors 
Williams won the Best Jazz Vocal Performance Grammy Award for his LP Nothin' but the Blues in 1984; it was also the winning Traditional Blues Album in the Blues Music Awards of the Blues Foundation in the following year. Williams was nominated for seven other Grammy awards: for Prez & Joe (1979); "8 to 5 I Lose" (1982); I Just Want To Sing (1986); Every Night: Live At Vine St. (1987); "I Won't Leave You Again" (with Lena Horne, 1988); "Is You Is or Is You Ain't My Baby" (with Marlena Shaw, 1989); and In Good Company (1989).

In 1988, Williams received an Honorary Doctorate of Music from Berklee College of Music. He also was a co-founder of the Fillius Jazz Archive from Hamilton College, where he also received an honorary degree.

In 1992, his 1955 recording of "Every Day I Have the Blues" with Basie was added to the Grammy Hall of Fame for recordings of particular historical or qualitative importance. Williams was added to the Jazz Wall of Fame of the American Society of Composers, Authors and Publishers in 2001.

In 1988, with his wife Jillean and friends, Williams set up the not-for-profit Joe Williams Every Day Foundation to offer scholarships to talented young musicians.

Discography

As leader
 Sings Everyday (Regent, 1952–1953 [rel. 1956])
 Count Basie Swings, Joe Williams Sings (Clef, 1955)
 The Greatest!! Count Basie Plays, Joe Williams Sings Standards (Verve, 1956)
 At Newport (with Count Basie) (Verve, 1957)
 One O'Clock Jump (with Count Basie, Ella Fitzgerald) (Verve, 1957)
 A Man Ain't Supposed to Cry (Roulette, 1958)
 Memories Ad-Lib (with Count Basie) (Roulette, 1959)
 Joe Williams Sings About You! (Roulette, 1959)
 Everyday I Have the Blues (with Count Basie) (Roulette, 1959)
 Joe Williams with Songs About 'That Kind of Woman'  (Roulette, 1960)
 Just the Blues (with Count Basie) (Roulette, 1960)
 Sentimental & Melancholy (Roulette, 1961)
 Together (with Harry "Sweets" Edison) (Roulette, 1961)
 Have a Good Time with Joe Williams (Roulette, 1961)
 Joe Williams Live! A Swingin' Night at Birdland (Roulette, 1962)
 Jump for Joy (RCA Victor, 1963)
 At Newport '63 (RCA Victor, 1963)
 One Is a Lonesome Number (Roulette, 1963)
 Me and the Blues (RCA Victor, 1964)
 A New Kind of Love (Roulette, 1964)
 We Three (with Dinah Washington, Sarah Vaughan) (Roulette, 1964)
 The Song Is You (RCA Victor, 1965)
 Scat Man Crothers & Joe Williams (Pickwick, 1965)
 The Exciting Joe Williams (RCA Victor, 1966)
 Alright, Okay (with Count Basie) (Verve [UK], 1966) compilation
 Presenting Joe Williams and Thad Jones Mel Lewis Jazz Orchestra (Solid State, 1967)
 Something Old, New and Blue (Solid State, 1968)
 Worth Waiting For... (Blue Note, 1970)
 The Heart and Soul of Joe Williams and George Shearing (Sheba, 1971)
 With Love (Temponic, 1972)
 Joe Williams Live (with Cannonball Adderley) (Fantasy, 1973)
 Prez & Joe: In Celebration of Lester Young (with Dave Pell's Prez Conference) (GNP Crescendo, 1979)
 Nothin' but the Blues (Delos, 1983)
 Then and Now (Bosco; Sea Breeze, 1984)
 I Just Want to Sing (Delos, 1985)
 Having the Blues Under European Sky (Denon, 1985)
 Every Night: Live at Vine St. (Verve, 1987)
 In Good Company (Verve, 1989)
 That Holiday Feelin' (Verve, 1990)
 Ballad and Blues Master [live] (Verve, 1992)
 Live at Orchestra Hall, Detroit (Telarc, 1993)
 Here's to Life (Telarc, 1994)
 Feel the Spirit (Telarc, 1995)

As guest
 Count Basie, A Night at Count Basie's (Vanguard, 1955)
 Count Basie, Breakfast Dance and Barbecue [live] (Roulette, 1959)
 Count Basie, Sing Along with Basie (with Lambert, Hendricks & Ross) (Roulette, 1959)
 The Capp-Pierce Juggernaut, Live at the Century Plaza (Concord Jazz, 1978)
 Benny Carter, Benny Carter Songbook (MusicMasters, 1996)
 Benny Carter, Benny Carter Songbook Volume II (MusicMasters, 1997)
 Lena Horne, The Men in My Life (Three Cherries, 1988)
 Milt Jackson, The Prophet Speaks (Qwest, 1994)
 Marian McPartland, Piano Jazz with Joe Williams (Jazz Alliance, 1991)
 Diane Schuur, Pure Schuur (GRP, 1991)

References

Further reading
 Balliett, Whitney (1988). American Singers: Twenty-seven Portraits in Song. Oxford; New York: Oxford University Press. . 
 Calloway, E. (April 28, 1990). "Defender Newsboy Joe Williams Grew up to be a Great Vocalist". The Chicago Defender 
 Crowther, B. (1999). [obituary]. Jazz Journal International 52 (5): 18
 
 Gardner, B. (1964). "Is Joe Williams Really Joe Williams?" Down Beat 31 (32): 19
 Gelb, H. (October 5, 1997). "Blues Singer Joe Williams Has Seen Hard Times, but Takes Solace from his Saviour: Joyful Noise". The San Francisco Examiner Magazine. 
 Gleason, R. J. (1956). Every Day is a Good Day for Joe Williams. Down Beat 23 (11): 11
 Gourse, Leslie (1985). Every Day: the Story of Joe Williams. London; New York: Quartet Books. .
 Harris, Sheldon (1979) Blues Who's Who: a Biographical Dictionary of Blues Singers. New Rochelle, NY: Arlington House. .
 Heckman, D. (March 31, 1999). [obituary]. Los Angeles Times
 Horricks, R. (1956). Joe Williams. Jazz Monthly 2 (7): 7
 Mitchell, R. (February 16, 1994). "Joe Williams Saves a Few of his High Notes". Houston Chronicle.
 Morgenstern, Dan (1987). "Joe Williams: the Boy Singer". JazzTimes (October): 36
 Sheridan, Chris (1986). Count Basie: a Bio-discography. New York: Greenwood Press. .
 Siegel, J. E. (1980). "Talking with Joe Williams". Radio Free Jazz 21 (January): 12
 Smith, A. J. (1976). "Joe Williams: the Well Tempered Blaze of Vocal Excellence". Down Beat 43 (9): 11
 Tomkins, L. (1963). "Frankly Speaking: Joe Williams". Crescendo 1 (6): 10
 Travis, Dempsey J. (1983). An Autobiography of Black Jazz. Chicago, IL: Urban Research Institute.  
 Williams, Joe (1980). "You and Me". Jazz Podium 29 (10): 12
 Zych, D. (1994). "Joe Williams: Celebrating Ev-e-ry-Day". Jazz Times 24 (2): 43
 [s.n.] (1988). Joe Williams. Jazz-Podium. 37 (7): 3

External links
 

1918 births
1999 deaths
Swing singers
People from Cordele, Georgia
American jazz singers
Apex Records artists
Blue Note Records artists
Englewood Technical Prep Academy alumni
Grammy Award winners
RCA Victor artists
Savoy Records artists
Traditional pop music singers
20th-century African-American male singers